Dimitrios 'Dimitris' Diamantidis (born May 6, 1980) is a retired Greek professional basketball player, who spent the last twelve seasons of his EuroLeague career with Panathinaikos, where he is now as the team's general manager. Widely regarded as one of the greatest European players ever to grace the game, he marked his era by being the most versatile player in the EuroLeague, serving as an inspiration to a whole generation of young European stars. He is the only player to have earned all four aforementioned EuroLeague end-of-season distinctions, even more so in a single year. Diamantidis is the only Greek player who is member of both EuroLeague 2000–10 All-Decade Team and EuroLeague 2010–20 All-Decade Team.

At the age of fourteen, Diamantidis started his basketball career with the youth clubs of his hometown team, AS Kastoria. Five years later, he made his professional debut with Iraklis Thessaloniki, and by 2003, he had emerged as an all-around star in the Greek League. He became a member of Panathinaikos Athens in the summer of 2004, with whom he won three EuroLeague titles, in 2007, 2009, and 2011, with the last two coming as the team's captain. Diamantidis' numerous accolades in the premier European club competition include a EuroLeague MVP Award, two EuroLeague Final Four MVP Awards, four All-EuroLeague First Team selections, as well as a record six EuroLeague Best Defender Awards. He is the EuroLeague's all-time leader in steals since the stat was first officially recognized starting with the 1991–92 season. On April 1, 2016, he was honored with a EuroLeague Basketball Legend Award.

Amidst a long series of "derbies of the eternal enemies", opposing Panathinaikos and Olympiacos Piraeus, Diamantidis thrived, as he faced Olympiacos every year for twelve consecutive seasons, including in eleven Greek League Finals, six Greek Cup Finals, and a EuroLeague semifinal. He won nine Greek League and ten Greek Cup titles, alongside a record six Greek League Finals MVP and a record six Greek League MVP awards, as well as two Greek Cup MVP awards. Diamantidis' personal friendship and rivalry with Olympiacos star Vassilis Spanoulis, was at the center of attention throughout six Greek League Finals and three Greek Cup Finals encounters. Diamantidis' self-effacing psyche helped relieve tension between the two powerhouses, when he retired in 2016.

As a member of the Greece men's national basketball team, Diamantidis won a EuroBasket gold medal in 2005; while anchoring a defense that allowed just 59.7 points per game. He also scored the three-pointer that sealed the fate of the semifinal game against France, just seconds before the game's final buzzer. He also led that tournament in assists, and was a part of the All-EuroBasket Team. In 2006, he played a pivotal role in a FIBA World Cup silver medal campaign, with Greece stunning Team USA in the semifinals, and Diamantidis finishing as the competition's steals leader. Diamantidis was also a two-time Olympian, as he donned the Greek colours in 2004 and 2008, and on both occasions earned the fifth place of the tournament, which is tied for the all-time best finish for Greece. On the basis of his myriad achievements, he was named the Mister Europa Player of the Year by Italian sports magazine Superbasket in 2007. He was also named the Greek Male Athlete of the Year in 2007. He was inducted into the  Greek Basket League Hall of Fame in 2022.

Early years
Diamantidis was born in Kastoria, Greece, on 6 May 1980. He began playing the sport of basketball with the youth teams of the local club AS Kastoria. The club would later go on to name its home arena, Dimitris Diamantidis Indoor Hall, after him in his honor.

Professional career

Iraklis Thessaloniki
In the summer of 1999, at the age of 19, Diamantidis began his professional career, when he signed with the Greek Basket League club Iraklis Thessaloniki. In his first pro season, in the 1999–00 Greek League season, he averaged 1.5 points, 1.6 rebounds, 0.8 assists, 0.8 steals, and 0.3 blocks per game. In his first season with the club, Diamantidis also played in the European-wide secondary league, the FIBA Saporta Cup. Diamantidis averaged 1.8 points, 1.2 rebounds, 0.4 assists, and 1.2 steals per game, during the Saporta Cup 1999–00 season.

In his second season with the club, in the 2000–01 Greek League season, he upped his averages to 3.4 points, 2.8 rebounds, 1.7 assists, 0.8 steals, and 0.3 blocks per game. Diamantidis also played in what was one of the two premier European-wide club competitions at that time, the FIBA SuproLeague. He averaged 2.2 points, 1.8 rebounds, 1.2 assists, 1.4 steals, and 0.6 blocks per game, during the SuproLeague's 2000–01 season.

In his third season with Iraklis, he continued to up his numbers in the Greek League, as he averaged 6.2 points, 4.7 rebounds, 2.8 assists, 1.5 steals, and 0.4 blocks per game, during the 2001–02 Greek League season. He was selected to the Greek League's All-Star Game, for the first time that season. Diamantidis also once again played in the Pan-European secondary league, in which he averaged 7.1 points, 5.2 rebounds, 2.8 assists, 1.7 steals, and 0.8 blocks per game, during the Saporta Cup's 2001–02 season.

In his fourth season with Iraklis, Diamantidis only played in the national domestic Greek Basket League. He continued to improve his individual numbers and performances, as he averaged 11.5 points, 5.6 rebounds, 5.0 assists, a league-leading 2.5 steals, and 0.9 blocks per game, during the 2002–03 Greek League season. He was also once again voted to the Greek League's All-Star Game.

In his fifth and final season with Iraklis, Diamantidis had his best year with the club. He averaged 14.8 points, 6.3 rebounds, 4.2 assists, a league-leading 2.5 steals, and 0.7 blocks per game, during the 2003–04 Greek League season. Due to his play, he was again voted to the Greek League's All-Star Game, and at the end of the season, he was also named the Greek League's MVP for the season. During his five seasons with Iraklis, one of the oldest Greek clubs, Diamantidis managed to help bring the team back into prominence in Greek competitions, after the club had been struggling in previous years.

Panathinaikos Athens

After his continued improvement and success with Iraklis, Diamantidis made a big step up in his career, with his move to Panathinaikos of Athens, in 2004; a basketball powerhouse of the Greek Basket League, and also of the EuroLeague. During his career with Panathinaikos, Diamantidis was given the nickname of "3-D", which stood for "Dimitris Diamantidis Defense" by the club's fans. Due to great individual and team successes, the late pharmaceutical magnate Pavlos Giannakopoulos, who was at that time the President of Panathinaikos, signed Diamantidis in 2008, to a 3-year, €5.7 million net income contract extension. In 2010, Diamantidis again renewed his contract with Panathinaikos for another 3 years, at €10.8 million gross income (€6 million net income). On February 21, 2013, Diamantidis became the EuroLeague's career leader in steals.

On July 4, 2013, Diamantidis renewed his contract with Panathinaikos for another 2 years, at a salary of €1.9 million net income per year. On October 30, 2014, Diamantidis became the first player in EuroLeague history to have dished out at least 1,000 career assists. On September 2, 2015, Diamantidis announced his retirement from playing professional club basketball, effective at the end of the 2015–16 Greek League season. In his last season with Panathinaikos, he was voted the Greek League Most Popular Player. Diamantidis retired as the all-time career leader in both assists and Performance Index Rating (PIR) in the entire history of the EuroLeague. Those records were eventually broken.

While he was a member of Panathinaikos, Diamantidis and Željko Obradović shared one of the most successful collaborations between a player and his head coach in the history of European club basketball. During his time with Panathinaikos, Diamantidis won the EuroLeague championship three times (2007, 2009, 2011), the Greek League championship nine times (2005, 2006, 2007, 2008, 2009, 2010, 2011, 2013, 2014), and the Greek Cup title ten times (2005, 2006, 2007, 2008, 2009, 2012, 2013, 2014, 2015, 2016). He also won the Triple Crown in 2007 and 2009.

Diamantidis also won several individual trophies with Panathinaikos, such as: the EuroLeague MVP in 2011, the EuroLeague Final Four MVP twice (2007, 2011), the EuroLeague Best Defender six times (2005, 2006, 2007, 2008, 2009, 2011), five of his six total Greek League MVP awards (2006, 2007, 2008, 2011, 2014), the Greek League Finals MVP six times (2006, 2007, 2008, 2009, 2011, 2014), and the MVP of the Greek Cup in 2009 and 2016. While he was a member of Panathinaikos, Diamantidis was also named the 2007 Mister Europa, and the 2007 Greek Athlete of the Year.

After he ended his playing career, Diamantidis had his #13 playing jersey officially retired by Panathinaikos. In 2020, Diamantidis was named "The Best Greek Professional Basketball Player of The 2010s Decade", by the readers of the Greek website Gazzetta.gr. In 2022, he became a member of the Greek Basket League Hall of Fame.

National team career
Diamantidis was a member of the Greek under-20 junior national team. He played with Greece's under-20 junior national team at the 2000 FIBA Europe Under-20 Championship, where Greece finished in seventh place. He averaged 3.0 points, 3.4 rebounds, 1.3 assists, and 2.5 steals per game at the tournament. As a part of the Greek men's under-26 national selection, Diamantidis won the silver medal at the 2001 Mediterranean Games.

Diamantidis was also a member of the Greece men's national basketball team. With Greece's senior team, he won the gold medal at the 2006 FIBA Stanković World Cup, and seven Acropolis Tournaments, while also being named the tournament's MVP twice, in 2005 and 2006.

On September 4, 2010, after Greece's elimination in the Eighth-Finals of the 2010 FIBA World Cup, at the hands of Spain (by a score of 80–72), Diamantidis announced his immediate retirement from the Greece National Team. He had 16 points, 4 rebounds, 2 assists, 2 steals, and 2 blocks in his last game with Greece's national team. He finished his career bearing the Greek flag, having played in 124 games, and having scored a total of 760 points, for a scoring average of 6.13 points per game.

FIBA EuroBasket
With the Greece men's national basketball team, Diamantidis participated at the 2003 EuroBasket, where Greece finished in fifth place, after beating Serbia and Montenegro, by a score of 72–64. Diamantidis won the gold medal at the 2005 EuroBasket. During the FIBA EuroBasket that year, he led the tournament in assists, and was selected to the All-Tournament Team. In the tournament's semifinals against the French national team, Diamantidis hit a game-winning three-point shot, with Greece trailing by a score of 66–64, at the end of the game, to give Greece a 67–66 victory, and send them to the European Championship's final game.

Diamantidis made 7 points, 7 rebounds, 4 assists, and 2 blocks for Greece at the 2007 EuroBasket, losing the bronze medal to Lithuania, 78–69.

FIBA World Cup
Diamantidis won the silver medal with Greece at the 2006 FIBA World Cup, which was held in Japan. In the tournament's semifinals, he was a key factor in Greece's historic 101–95 victory against Team USA, with 12 points, 3 rebounds, 5 assists, and 2 steals, while facing the likes of LeBron James, Dwyane Wade, Carmelo Anthony, Chris Bosh, Chris Paul, and Dwight Howard. The defeat suffered by the United States team was the only one during Mike Krzyzewski's second era as the team's head coach (2005–2016). Coach Krzyzewski, in a press conference during the 2014 FIBA World Cup, stated: "2006, that's a lesson we learned. The Greek Team taught us (Team USA) how to play internationally."

Diamantidis also represented Greece at the 2010 FIBA World Cup. He averaged 10.0 points, 3.5 rebounds, 3.8 assists, 1.5 steals, and 0.5 blocks per game at that tournament.

Summer Olympic Games
Diamantidis was a member of Greece's senior national team that competed at the 2004 Athens Summer Olympics. He was also selected to play on Greece's senior national team for the 2008 Beijing Summer Olympics. Greece finished in fifth place in both tournaments, losing both times to Argentina in the competition's quarterfinals.

Managerial career
Diamantidis retired from playing professional club basketball in 2016. Four years later, in 2020, he became the general manager of the Greek club Panathinaikos Athens, the same team that he had spent the last 12 seasons of his playing career with. As the team's general manager over three years, Diamantidis won three titles: the 2020–21 Greek Basket League season's championship, the 2020–21 Greek Basketball Cup title, and the 2021 Greek Basketball Super Cup title.

Player profile
As a left-handed player, Diamantidis played as a point guard, shooting guard, and small forward. In the Greek men's national basketball team, his primary position was small forward, with him often being utilized as a point forward. He was primarily a pass first playmaker with outstanding court vision, and an excellent three point shooter, both in spot up situations and off the dribble. He liked to post up smaller point guards. Gifted with a tremendous wingspan for his height (2.16 m or 7'1"), and a unique feel for positioning, he was generally considered to be one of the best defensive players ever to play in the EuroLeague, having won the EuroLeague Best Defender award in five consecutive seasons, and once again, two years later.

As demonstrated by numerous gamechanging actions in crucial situations, Diamantidis was considered to be one of the best decision makers and clutch players in European basketball history.

Career statistics

EuroLeague

|-
! colspan="14" | FIBA SuproLeague 
|-
| style="text-align:left;" | 2000–01
| style="text-align:left;" | Iraklis
| 13 || – || 14.2 || .269 || .200 || .750 || 1.8 || 1.2 || 1.4 || .6 || 2.2 || 3.2
|- class="sortbottom"
| style="text-align:left;"| Career SL
| style="text-align:left;"|
| 13 || – || 14.2 || .269 || .200 || .750 || 1.8 || 1.2 || 1.4 || .6 || 2.2 || 3.2
|-
! colspan="14" | EuroLeague 
|-
| style="text-align:left;"| 2004–05
| style="text-align:left;" rowspan=12| Panathinaikos
| 25 || 20 || 27.4 || .544 || .467 || .709 || 3.7 || 3.1 || 2.0 || .6 || 8.5 || 12.5
|-
| style="text-align:left;"| 2005–06
| 23 || 22 || 30.1 || .492 || .269 || .785 || 4.5 || 2.9 || 2.3 || .8 || 8.7 || 13.1
|-
| style="text-align:left;background:#AFE6BA;"| 2006–07†
| 24 || 24 || 29.1 || .489 || .460 || .780 || 3.9 || 3.9 || 2.2 || .6 || 8.9 || 14.3
|-
| style="text-align:left;"| 2007–08
| 19 || 19 || 30.9 || .484 || .435 || .769 || 5.3 || 3.3 || 1.8 || .7 || 8.5 || 15.1
|-
| style="text-align:left;background:#AFE6BA;"| 2008–09†
| 21 || 12 || 27.3 || .486 || .441 || .863 || 4.4 || 3.1 || 1.5 || .5 || 8.5 || 14.0
|-
| style="text-align:left;"| 2009–10
| 12 || 9 || 26.7 || .559 || .516 || .738 || 2.9 || 3.3 || 1.5 || .3 || 9.4 || 13.7
|-
| style="text-align:left;background:#AFE6BA;"| 2010–11†
| 22 || 21 || 30.5 || .433 || .370 || .872 || 3.9 || style="background:#cfecec;"| 6.2*  || 1.6 || .1 || 12.5 || 18.5
|-
| style="text-align:left;"| 2011–12
| 23 || 21 || 30.0 || .448 || .425 || .882 || 3.7 || 4.8 || 1.5 || .5 || 11.5 || 16.4
|-
| style="text-align:left;"| 2012–13
| 27 || 25 || 31.5 || .368 || .315 || .712 || 3.4 || 5.8 || 1.4 || .4 || 8.1 || 13.1
|-
| style="text-align:left;"| 2013–14
| 29 || 27 || 31.2 || .324 || .283 || .763 || 2.4 || style="background:#cfecec;"| 6.2*  || 1.4 || .1 || 8.9 || 12.8
|-
| style="text-align:left;"| 2014–15
| 27 || 27 || 27.3 || .410 || .379 || .814 || 2.3 || 5.9 || .9 || .3 || 8.0 || 12.1
|-
| style="text-align:left;"| 2015–16
| 26 || 1 || 21.2 || .459 || .376 || .827 || 2.3 || 4.2 || .8 || .2 || 7.2 || 10.3
|- class="sortbottom"
| style="text-align:left;"| Career EL
| style="text-align:left;"|
| 278 || 228 || 28.7 || .442 || .375 || .795 || 3.5 || 4.5 || 1.6 || .4 || 9.0 || 13.7
|- class="sortbottom"
| style="text-align:left;"| Career SL/EL
| style="text-align:left;"|
| 291 || 228 || 28.0 || .440 || .373 || .794 || 3.4 || 4.4 || 1.6 || .4 || 8.7 || 13.2

International statistics

|-
| style="text-align:left;"| 2000
| style="text-align:left;"| Europe Under-20
| style="text-align:left;"| Greece Under-20
| 8 || N/A || 23.5 || .444 || .200 || .333 || 3.4 || 1.3 || 2.5 || .0 || 3.0
|- class="sortbottom"
| style="text-align:center;" colspan=3| Career
| 8 || N/A || 23.5 || .444 || .200 || .333 || 3.4 || 1.3 || 2.5 || .0 || 3.0

|-
| style="text-align:left;background:#C0C0C0;"| 2001
| style="text-align:left;"| Mediterranean Games
| style="text-align:left;" rowspan=12| Greece Men
| 4 || – || – || – || – || – || – || – || – || – || 1.5
|- 
| style="text-align:left;"| 2003
| style="text-align:left;"| EuroBasket qualifiers
| 4 || N/A || 17.2 || .571 || .500 || .000 || 3.2 || 1.8 || 0.5 || 0.5 || 2.2
|- 
| style="text-align:left;"| 2003
| style="text-align:left;"| EuroBasket
| 6 || N/A ||16.0 || .214 || .200 || .636 || 2.2 || 2.3 || 0.5 || 0.0 || 2.5
|- 
| style="text-align:left;"| 2004
| style="text-align:left;"| Summer Olympics
| 6 || N/A || 18.7 || .381 || .200 || .692 || 3.8 || 2.5 || 0.8 || 0.5 || 4.5
|- 
| style="text-align:left;background:#FFD700;"| 2005
| style="text-align:left;"| EuroBasket
| 7 || 7 || 31.4 || .303 || .214 || .682 || 5.1 || style="background:#cfecec;"| 5.0 || 2.8 || 0.0 || 5.4
|- 
| style="text-align:left;background:#FFD700;"| 2006
| style="text-align:left;"| Stanković World Cup
| 3 || N/A || 22.3 || .750 || .500 || .000 || 2.7 || 3.0 || 3.0 || 0.0 || 4.7
|- 
| style="text-align:left;background:#DCE5E5;"| 2006
| style="text-align:left;"| World Cup
| 9 || N/A || 29.9 || .511 || .440 || .708 || 3.9 || 2.9 || style="background:#cfecec;"| 3.3 || 0.6 || 8.4
|- 
| style="text-align:left;"| 2007
| style="text-align:left;"| EuroBasket
| 9 || 9 || 32.8 || .362 || .350 || .923 || 5.0 || 2.1 || 1.3 || 1.0 || 8.9
|- 
| style="text-align:left;background:#FFD700;"| 2008
| style="text-align:left;"| World OQT
| 4 || N/A || 26.8 || .654 || style="background:#cfecec;"| .600 || .500 || 4.2 || 3.8 || 0.8 || 0.0 || 11.0
|- 
| style="text-align:left;"| 2008
| style="text-align:left;"| Summer Olympics
| 6 || N/A || 28.3 || .421 || .368 || .833 || 3.5 || 2.3 || 1.3 || 0.3 || 7.3
|- 
| style="text-align:left;"| 2010
| style="text-align:left;"| World Cup
| 6 || 6 || 29.2 || .465 || .353 || .667 || 3.5 || 3.8 || 1.5 || 0.5 || 10.0
|- class="sortbottom"
| style="text-align:center;" colspan=3| Career
| 64 || N/A || 26.3 || .437 || .364 || .723 || 3.9 || 3.0 || 1.7 || 0.4 || 6.8

Awards and honors

Club career
 3× EuroLeague Champion: (2007, 2009, 2011)
 9× Greek League Champion: (2005, 2006, 2007, 2008, 2009, 2010, 2011, 2013, 2014)
 10× Greek Cup Winner: (2005, 2006, 2007, 2008, 2009, 2012, 2013, 2014, 2015, 2016)
 2× Triple Crown Winner: 2007, 2009

Greek senior national team
 2001 Mediterranean Games: 
 2005 EuroBasket: 
 2006 FIBA Stanković World Cup: 
 2006 FIBA World Championship: 
 2008 FIBA World OQT: 
 7× Acropolis Tournament Champion: (2002, 2003, 2005, 2006, 2007, 2008, 2010)

Individual awards

Pro clubs
 EuroLeague MVP: 2011
 2× EuroLeague Final Four MVP: 2007, 2011
6× EuroLeague Best Defender: 2005, 2006, 2007, 2008, 2009, 2011
4× All-EuroLeague First Team: 2007, 2011, 2012, 2013
 2× EuroLeague MVP of the Month: December 2010, March/April  2012
 5× EuroLeague MVP of the Round: 2008 (Top 16 Week 3), 2010 (regular-season Week 3), 2012 (2× - Playoff Games 1 and 5), 2014 (Top 16 Week 3)
 EuroLeague 2000–10 All-Decade Team: 2010
EuroLeague 2010–20 All-Decade Team: 2020
 EuroLeague Basketball Legend Award: 2016
 2× EuroLeague Assists Leader: 2011, 2014
 2× Eurobasket.com's  All-Euroleague Defensive Team: (2008, 2011)
 6× Greek League MVP: 2004, 2006, 2007, 2008, 2011, 2014
 6× Greek League Finals MVP: 2006, 2007, 2008, 2009, 2011, 2014
Greek League Best Defender: 2011
 11× All-Greek League Team: 2004, 2005, 2006, 2007, 2008, 2010, 2011, 2012, 2013, 2014, 2016
 12× Greek League All-Star: 2002, 2003, 2004, 2005, 2006, 2007, 2008, 2009, 2010, 2011, 2013, 2014
 5× Greek League Assists Leader: 2006, 2007, 2010, 2011, 2015
 6× Led Greek League in steals: 2003, 2004, 2005, 2006, 2007, 2008
 2× Greek Cup MVP: 2009, 2016
 2× Greek Cup Finals Top Scorer: 2009, 2013  
 Greek League Most Popular Player: 2016   
 Greek Male Athlete of the Year: 2007 
EuroBasket assists leader: (2005)
EuroBasket All-Tournament Team:  (2005)
 Superbasket Magazine's Mister Europa Player of the Year: 2007
 Eurobasket.com's All-Europe Player of the Year: 2007
 6× Eurobasket.com's All-Greek League Player of the Year (2004, 2006, 2007, 2011, 2013, 2014)
 10× Eurobasket.com's All-Greek League Domestic Players Team (2005, 2006–2008, 2010–2016)
 12× Eurobasket.com's  All-Greek League Defensive Team: (2004, 2005, 2007–2011–2016)
 EuroLeague career steals leader since the 2000–01 season
 Professional Greek Basket League career steals leader
 No. 13 retired by Panathinaikos: 2016
 101 Greats of European Basketball: (2018)
 Greek Basket League Hall of Fame: 2022

Greek senior national team
 EuroBasket All-Tournament Team: 2005
 EuroBasket Assists Leader: 2005
 FIBA World Cup Steals Leader: 2006
 2× Acropolis Tournament MVP: 2005, 2006
 Voted one of the Greece men's national basketball team's Best 5 Players of the FIBA EuroBasket's 2000–2020 era: 2020
 Voted one of FIBA EuroBasket's Best 5 Players overall of the 2000–2020 era: 2020

Notes

References

External links

 Dimitris Diamantidis at basket.gr 
 Dimitris Diamantidis at eurobasket.com
 Dimitris Diamantidis at euroleague.net
 Dimitris Diamantidis at esake.gr 
 Dimitris Diamantidis at fiba.com (archive)
 Dimitris Diamantidis at fibaeurope.com
 Dimitris Diamantidis at g-sports.gr/esake/stats/basketleague.html 

1980 births
Living people
2006 FIBA World Championship players
2010 FIBA World Championship players
Basketball players at the 2004 Summer Olympics
Basketball players at the 2008 Summer Olympics
Competitors at the 2001 Mediterranean Games
FIBA EuroBasket-winning players
Greek Basket League players
Greek basketball executives and administrators
Greek men's basketball players
Iraklis Thessaloniki B.C. players
Mediterranean Games medalists in basketball
Mediterranean Games silver medalists for Greece
Olympic basketball players of Greece
Panathinaikos B.C. players
Sportspeople from Kastoria
Point guards
Shooting guards
Small forwards